Spirama recessa is a moth of the family Erebidae. It is found in New Guinea and tropical northern Australia.

The wingspan is about 50 mm. The pattern on the wings looks like the face of a snake with slightly opened mouth.

Gallery

References

External links
Australian Caterpillars

Moths described in 1858
Spirama